Adar is a small town and rural commune in Taroudant Province of the Souss-Massa-Drâa region of Morocco. At the time of the 2004 census, the commune had a total population of 5098 people living in 1160 households.

References

Populated places in Taroudannt Province
Rural communes of Souss-Massa